PatrolBot is a programmable autonomous general purpose service robot rover built by MobileRobots Inc. PatrolBots are manufactured in various configurations and  serve as bases for companies developing delivery robots, security robots, environmental monitoring rovers, robot guides and other indoor service robots.

Capabilities of PatrolBot 
PatrolBot can scan buildings, create floor plans and navigate them autonomously using a laser range-finding sensor inside the robot. It employs Monte Carlo/Markov-style localization techniques using a modified value-iterated search technique for navigation. It searches for alternative paths if a hall is blocked, circumnavigates obstacles and re-charges itself at its automated docking/charging station as needed. Using a Wi-Fi system the device can operate autonomously or be controlled remotely.

Applications 

PatrolBot is a robotic base used for delivery, security, sensor monitoring, inspection and guidance tasks. It is a reference platform added onto with various carrying attachments, sensors, touchscreens and cameras. While it began primarily as a security robot the platform is now used as a base for a broad range of applications.

Robot Control 
Users set up the robot using a GUI interface to give goals, docking location and constraints such as forbidden areas into the robot's map. Then, using drag and drop, an operator can give goal names, tasks and macros into a "route" or program for the robot to follow. Users can then use set or random sequences for the robot to follow by dragging routes into a weekly schedule. Advanced users can communicate with the robot from external systems or program more advance actions over a command language interface as well as add new sensors.

PatrolBot can be sent to goals on demand or can patrol a sequence of goals. Status windows in the control GUI provide read-outs from the sensors as well as proprioceptive information such as battery levels. The robot's data logs are available for security and energy optimization as well as troubleshooting.

References

External links
The PatrolBot page at MobileRobots Inc.
PatrolBot: Robots Move Into Corporate Roles.

Service robots
Differential wheeled robots